Cazenove is a ward in the London Borough of Hackney and the area forms part of the Hackney North and Stoke Newington constituency. Its name derives from the Cazenove Road which runs through the ward. The population of the ward was 13,392 at the 2011 Census.

2002–2014
The ward was created for the May 2002 election.

The ward returned three councillors to Hackney London Borough Council, with elections every four years. At the election on 6 May 2010 Ian Sharer, Dawood Akhoon and Abraham (Sam) Jacobson, all candidates for the Liberal Democrats, were elected. The turnout was 61%, and 5,013 votes were cast.

The area was bounded by Upper Clapton to the east, Stamford Hill to the north, Stoke Newington to the west and Stoke Newington Common to the south.
Cazenove ward at this time had a population of 10,504. This compares with the average ward population within the borough of 10,674.

From 2014
In May 2014 the wards of Hackney were redrawn. The Cazenove ward expanded slightly to the northeast, taking in part of the Springfield ward. It returns three councillors.

In the 2018 election Cazenove Ward returned three labour candidates - Caroline Woodley, Sam Pallis and Anthony McMahon.  There was a 48.1% turn out.

References

External links
 Cazenove Area Action Group
 Hackney Liberal Democrats.
 London Borough of Hackney list of constituencies and councillors.
 2002 election results
 2006 election results
2018 Election results

Wards of the London Borough of Hackney
2002 establishments in England